Artashat is a town and administrative centre of the Artashat Municipality and the Ararat Province of Armenia. It is located on the Araks River in the Ararat plain, 30 km southeast of Yerevan. Artashat was founded in 1945 by the Soviet government of Armenia and named after the nearby ancient city of Artashat.

Modern Artashat is on the Yerevan-Nakhchivan-Baku and Nakhchivan-Tabriz railway and on Yerevan-Goris-Stepanakert highway. The name of the city is derived from Iranian languages and means the "joy of Arta". Founded by King Artashes I in 176 BC, ancient Artashat served as the capital of the Kingdom of Armenia from 185 BC until 120 AD, and was known as the "Vostan Hayots" or "court" or "seal of the Armenians".

As of the 2011 census, the population of Artashat was 22,269. As per the 2016 official estimate, the town has a population of 18,700.

Etymology
Modern Artashat is located around 8 km north of the ancient city of Artashat. Ancient Artashat itself is named after king Artashes; the founder of the Artaxiad Dynasty of the ancient Kingdom of Armenia. The name of the city is derived from Iranian languages and means the "joy of Arta". Founded by King Artaxias I in 176 BC, Artaxata served as the capital of the Kingdom of Armenia from 185 BC until 120 AD, and was known as the "Vostan Hayots" ("court/seal of the Armenians.

History

Antiquity

King Artashes I founded Artashat in 176 BC in the Vostan Hayots canton within the historical province of Ayrarat, at the point where Araks river was joined by Metsamor river during that ancient eras, near the heights of Khor Virap. The story of the foundation is given by the Armenian historian Movses Khorenatsi of the fifth century: "Artashes traveled to the location of the confluence of the Yeraskh and Metsamor [rivers] and taking a liking to the position of the hills [adjacent to Mount Ararat], he chose it as the location of his new city, naming it after himself." According to the accounts given by Greek historians Plutarch and Strabo, Artashat is said to have been chosen and developed on the advice of the Carthaginian general Hannibal. However, modern historians argue that there is no direct evidence to support this.

Artashes also built a citadel (which was later named Khor Virap and gained prominence as the location where Gregory the Illuminator was to be imprisoned by Trdat the Great) and added other fortifications, including a moat.

During the reign of Tigranes II, the Armenian kingdom expanded and conquered many territories in the south and west, ultimately reaching the Mediterranean Sea. Due to the remoteness of Artashat in the greater context of the empire, Tigranes built a new capital called Tigranakert. However, in 69 the Roman general Lucullus invaded Armenia, defeated Tigranes' forces at the outskirts of Tigranakert, and sacked the new capital. As the harassed Roman forces continued to move northeast in pursuit of the Armenian king, a second prominent battle took place, this time at Artashat where, according to Roman sources, Tigranes II was defeated once again. Artashat was restored as capital of Armenia in 60 B.C.

In 449, just before the Battle of Avarayr, the city witnessed the "Artashat Council" where the political and religious leaders of Christian Armenia gathered to discuss the threats of the Persian Sassanian king Yazdegerd II. However, after losing its status as a capital to Vagharshapat and later Dvin, Artashat gradually lost its significance.

The exact location of ancient Artashat was identified during the 1920s, with archaeological excavations beginning in 1970.

Modern history

The modern town of Artashat was founded by the Soviet government in 1945 as an urban community, with the merger of three villages: Upper Ghamarlu, Lower Ghamarlu and Novruzlu, with Upper Ghamarlu being the largest one. It was named after the historical city of Artashat, located 8 km northwest of the modern town.

Until the 1920s, Upper Ghamarlu had many small manufacturers of Armenian cognac. During the Soviet Days, the town has gradually grown as an industrial hub, mainly in the sphere of food-processing and building materials production. In 1970, Artashat was given the status of a "city of republican subordination" within the Armenian SSR.

In 1995, with the new law of the territorial administration of the Republic of Armenia, Artashat became the provincial centre of the newly formed Ararat Province.

Geography

Artashat is situated at the east of the central part of modern-day Armenia, occupying the southeastern part of the Ararat plain, only 3.5 km east of Araks river on the Armenia-Turkey border. At an approximate height of 830 meters above sea level, the town is dominated by the Yeranos mountains from the north, the mountains of Gegham, Dahnak and Mzhkatar from the east, and the Urts mountains from the southeast.

Historically, the current territory of the town was part of the Vostan Hayots canton of Ayrarat province of Ancient Armenia.

Currently, Artashat is divided into 4 districts: Norvzlu, Kentron, Ghamarlu and Southwestern district. Almost half of the population of the town are residing in the Southwestern district. The town is surrounded by the villages of Mrgavan, Vostan and Shahumyan from the north, east and the south respectively.

Climate
Artashat has a cold semi-arid climate (Köppen climate classification BSk).

Demographics

The majority of the population in Artashat are ethnic Armenians who migrated from the Iranian cities of Khoy and Salmas, after the Russo-Persian War of 1826–28. They belong to the Armenian Apostolic Church. The regulating body of the church is the Araratian Pontifical Diocese, headed by Archbishop Navasard Kchoyan (seat in Yerevan).

The town's new church of Surp Hovhannes (Saint John the Evangelist) was consecrated on 31 May 2015.

Artashat is home to tiny Assyrian and Russian communities.

The population of Artashat since 1945 is as follows:

Culture 

The cultural life of Artashat is enhancing with the presence of several institutions. The town has a cultural palace, an art center named after Charles Aznavour, a drama theatre named after Amo Kharazyan and a public library named after Ohan Chubaryan (opened in 1948).

During the events dedicated to the 1600th anniversary of the invention of the Armenian alphabet, sculptors from all over Armenia and the diaspora created many cultural monuments in the center of Artashat. The monument of King Artashes I also stands in the center of the city.

Ancient Artaxata is city where the first ever theater show has been performed in the history of the Armenian nation. King Artavazd II (55-34 BC) staged and directed The Bacchae of Euripides at the Artashat amphitheater in 53 BC with the presence of king Orodes II of Parthia.

At present, the Artashat Drama Theatre named after Amo Kharazyan regularly performs several Armenian and international classic as well as modern works.

Transportation
Artashat is a major point on the M-2 Motorway that connects the capital Yerevan with southern Armenia reaching up to the Iranian border.

The town has a railway station that used to connect Yerevan with the Nakhchivan Autonomous Republic during the Soviet years.

Economy

After facing serious difficulties during the economical crisis of the 1990s in Armenia, many firms in Artashat overcame the hard situation and started producing their products to serve the domestic and international markets.

Currently, Artashat is home to many large industrial firms, mainly involved in food processing and building materials. The "Artfood Artashat Cannery" (since 1961) is among the leading processed food producers in Armenia. The "Shaumyan Alco" for brandy and vodka is operating in the town since 2007. In 2009, the "Ararat Group" for mineral water and soft drinks had opened its factory in Artashat with a total investment of US$27 million.

Other industrial plant of Artashat include the "Izipanel" company specialized in sandwich panel manufacturing, as well as many small plants that produce building materials, textile, etc.

Many large construction companies operate in the town as well.

Education
As of 2016, Artashat has 6 public education schools, 7 kindergartens, 1 musical school named after Alexander Melik Pashaev (opened in 1956), 1 art academy and 2 sport schools. In addition, the town has its domestic TV station, as well as a number of local newspapers.

Sport

Artashat has a municipal football stadium opened in 1960, where many competitions and championships for young football teams and athletics are held. FC Dvin Artashat, founded in 1982 as Olympia Artashat, was the only football club in the city. After the 1999 Armenian Premier League season, the club was dissolved due to financial difficulties and is currently inactive from professional football.

The stadium of Artashat is the regular home of the annual National Athletics Championship of Armenia.

Twin towns – sister cities

Artashat is twinned with:
 Clamart, France (2003)
 Pestszentlőrinc-Pestszentimre (Budapest), Hungary (2003)

Notable people
Sergo Karapetyan, Armenian politician and former minister of agriculture
Gusan Haykazun, contemporary Armenian composer
Varuzhan Yepremyan, renowned Armenian painter
Gegham Kadymyan, Armenian footballer
Arayik Gevorgyan, three time world champion in wrestling

See also
Ararat Province
Artaxata
Verin Artashat

References

Further reading

 Arakelyan, Babken N. "Основные результаты раскопок древнего Арташата в 1970-73 гг.," Patma-Banasirakan Handes 4 (1974).
 _. Հին Արտաշատ [Ancient Artashat]. Yerevan: Armenian Academy of Sciences, 1975.
 ___. "Les fouilles d'Artaxata: Bilan Provisoire," Revue des Études Arméniennes 18 (1984), pp. 367–395.
 Yeremyan, Suren T. Հայաստանը ըստ «Աշխարհացույց»-ի [Armenia According to the Ashkharhatsuyts]. Yerevan: Armenian Academy of Sciences, 1963.

Populated places in Ararat Province
Ararat Province
Erivan Governorate
Yazidi populated places in Armenia
 Populated places established in the 2nd century BC